Risako (written: 梨紗子, 梨沙子 or 理紗子) is a feminine Japanese given name. Notable people with the name include:

, Japanese actress, model and gravure idol
, Japanese sport wrestler
, Japanese synchronized swimmer
, Japanese women's footballer
, Japanese singer and idol

Japanese feminine given names